In business finance, trade working capital (TWC) is the difference between current assets and current liabilities related to the everyday operations of a company. TWC is usually expressed in percentage of sales.

Corporate finance
Management cybernetics